Adam Silver (born April 25, 1962) is an American lawyer and sports executive who serves as the fifth and current commissioner of the National Basketball Association (NBA). He joined the NBA in 1992 and has held various positions within the league, becoming chief operating officer and deputy commissioner under his predecessor and mentor David Stern in 2006. When Stern retired in 2014, Silver was named the new commissioner.

During Silver's tenure, the league has continued to grow economically and globally, especially in China. Silver made headlines in 2014 for forcing Donald Sterling to sell the Los Angeles Clippers, then banning Sterling for life from all NBA games and events following racist remarks.

Early life
Silver was born into a Jewish-American family. His father Edward Silver (1921–2004) was a lawyer who specialized in labor law and was a senior partner at the law firm Proskauer Rose. Silver grew up in Rye, New York, a northern suburb of New York City in Westchester County. He attended Rye High School and graduated in 1980.

After high school, Silver went to Duke University. He was a member of the Phi Delta Theta fraternity, and graduated in 1984 with a Bachelor of Arts degree in political science. He worked from 1984 to 1985 as a legislative aide to Les AuCoin, who was a member of the U.S. House of Representatives. Silver then attended the University of Chicago Law School, graduating in 1988 with a J.D. degree.

After law school, Silver spent one year as a law clerk for Judge Kimba Wood of the U.S. District Court for the Southern District of New York. He then joined the law firm of Cravath, Swaine & Moore as an associate.

NBA career
Prior to becoming commissioner, Silver was the NBA's deputy commissioner and chief operating officer for eight years. In that role, he was involved in the negotiation of the league's last three collective bargaining agreements with the National Basketball Players Association, the development of the WNBA and NBA Development League, the partnership with Turner Broadcasting to manage the NBA's digital assets, and the creation of NBA China.

Previously, Silver spent eight years as president and COO of NBA Entertainment. Since joining the NBA in 1992, Silver has also held the positions of senior VP and COO, NBA Entertainment, NBA chief of staff, and special assistant to the commissioner. During his time with NBA Entertainment, Silver was an executive producer of the IMAX movie Michael Jordan to the Max, as well as the documentary Whatever Happened to Micheal Ray? He also worked on the production side of Like Mike and The Year of the Yao.

Commissioner 
On October 25, 2012, he was endorsed by David Stern to be the next NBA commissioner. On February 1, 2014, when Stern stepped down from his position, Silver was unanimously approved by the NBA owners to succeed him.

On April 25, 2014, TMZ Sports released a video of Los Angeles Clippers owner Donald Sterling holding a conversation with his girlfriend that included racist remarks. Silver responded on April 29, 2014, announcing that Sterling had been banned from the NBA for life. In addition, Silver fined Sterling $2.5 million, the maximum allowed under the NBA constitution. Silver stripped Sterling from virtually all of his authority over the Clippers, and urged owners to vote to expel Sterling from ownership of the Clippers. Sterling was disallowed from entering any Clippers facility as well as attending any NBA games. It was one of the most severe punishments ever imposed on a professional sports owner.

On November 13, 2014, Silver published an op-ed piece in The New York Times, where he announced that he is in favor of legalized and regulated sports betting, mentioning that it should be "brought out of the underground and into the sunlight where it can be appropriately monitored and regulated."

On October 4, 2019, Houston Rockets general manager Daryl Morey issued a tweet that supported the 2019–2020 Hong Kong protests. Morey later deleted the tweet. On October 6, Morey and the NBA each issued separate statements addressing the original tweet; Morey said that he never intended his tweet to cause any offense while the NBA said the tweet was "regrettable". The statements drew attention and subsequent bipartisan criticism from several US politicians. On October 7, Silver defended league's response to the tweet, supporting Morey's right to freedom of expression while also accepting the right of reply from the government of and businesses from China. Soon after, Silver faced a risk between the partnership of China and the NBA. China responded negatively with decisions to possibly cut ties from the NBA. Silver publicly said, "It is inevitable that people around the world—including from America and China—will have different viewpoints over different issues. ... It is not the role of the NBA to adjudicate those differences." Chinese smartphone manufacturer Vivo responded to Silver's statements, stating, "Vivo has always insisted on the principle that the national interest is above all else and firmly opposes any remark and behavior that constitutes a challenge to the national sovereignty and territorial integrity. ... Starting today, Vivo will suspend all cooperation with the NBA."

On March 11, 2020, Silver made the decision to suspend the 2019–20 NBA season in reaction to the COVID-19 pandemic. On June 4, 2020, it was announced that the season would resume for 22 of the 30 teams in the NBA Bubble, a $170 million investment to protect the players, the coaches, and the successful completion of the season. Near the end of the regular season, Silver stated that the bubble was "better than what we had envisioned."

Honors and other activities
In 2016, Sports Business Journal ranked Silver No. 1 on its list of the 50 Most Influential People in Sports Business. In 2015, Silver was named Executive of the Year by Sports Business Journal. That year he was also named one of Time 100 Most Influential People and one of Fortune 50 Greatest Leaders.

In 2014, Silver was named the Sports Illustrated Executive of the Year. He is on Duke University's Board of Trustees and received the 2016 Distinguished Alumnus Award from the University of Chicago Law School. He is also on the board of the Lustgarten Foundation for Pancreatic Cancer Research.

Personal life
In 2015, Silver married interior designer Maggie Grise. They have two daughters, born in April 2017 and May 2020.

References

External links

 NBA.com profile

1962 births
Living people
Businesspeople from New York City
Cravath, Swaine & Moore associates
Duke University Trinity College of Arts and Sciences alumni
National Basketball Association commissioners
New York (state) lawyers
20th-century American Jews
People from Rye, New York
Sportspeople from New York City
Sportspeople from Westchester County, New York
University of Chicago Law School alumni
21st-century American Jews